Wingaroo is a rural locality in the local government area (LGA) of Flinders in the North-east LGA region of Tasmania. The 2016 census recorded a population of nil for the state suburb of Wingaroo.

History 
Wingaroo is a confirmed locality.

Geography
The waters of Bass Strait form the north-eastern boundary.

Road infrastructure 
Route B85 (Palana Road) provides access to the locality.

References

Towns in Tasmania
Flinders Island